Cedar Lake is a lake in Minneapolis, Minnesota, United States, and part of the city's Chain of Lakes. It is located on the west side of the city, north of Bde Maka Ska and west of Lake of the Isles. The lake is surrounded by parkland, with some easements having been made to private homeowners on the southeast side; it is the only lake in the city with private shoreline. The south and west sides border the Cedar-Isles-Dean neighborhood, while the east shore flanks the Kenwood residential area. On the north is the Cedar Lake Trail and the BNSF Railway, and the south Bryn Mawr neighborhood. The Minneapolis Park and Recreation Board manages the lake and parkland around the lake.

Paths
Cedar Lake is part of the Grand Rounds Scenic Byway, connecting with Brownie Lake Park on the north end and Bde Maka Ska and Lake of the Isles on the south and east ends, respectively, via the parkway system.  The Cedar Lake Trail, on the north shore of the lake, serves as both a recreational trail and a link for non-motorized commuters to reach downtown Minneapolis. The  shared-use path has three separate lanes, a pedestrian lane and east–west lanes for bicyclists and other wheeled users. Trails around the lake on the west include separate bicycle and pedestrian trails as do paths on the Kenilworth Trail, a short distance off the east side of the lake.

Beaches
There are three official swimming beaches at the lake, Cedar Lake East Beach, Cedar Lake Point Beach, and Cedar Lake South Beach.

Fish

The lake contains black bullhead, black crappie, bluegill, bowfin, carp, green sunfish, hybrid sunfish, largemouth bass, northern pike, pumpkinseed, tiger muskellunge, walleye, white sucker, and yellow perch. Some fish consumption guideline restrictions have been placed on the lake's bluegill, carp, crappie, largemouth bass, northern pike, and walleye due to mercury and/or PFOS contamination.

See also
 List of lakes in Minneapolis
 List of shared-use paths in Minneapolis

References

External links
 Minnesota DNR Lake Information Report
 Minneapolis Parks – Cedar Lake
 

Lakes of Minneapolis
Lakes of Hennepin County, Minnesota
Parks in Minneapolis
Lakes of Minnesota
Shared-use paths in Minneapolis